Herbert Wesley Cummings (July 13, 1873 – March 4, 1956) was a Democratic member of the U.S. House of Representatives from Pennsylvania.

Herbert W. Cummings was born in West Chillisquaque Township, Pennsylvania. He graduated from the Lewisburg, Pennsylvania High School in 1890. He studied law, was admitted to the bar, and commenced practice in Sunbury, Pennsylvania. He served as district attorney of Northumberland County, Pennsylvania in 1901 and 1904 to 1908. He was elected judge of the common pleas court of Northumberland County in 1911 and served ten years as president judge.

Cummings was elected as a Democrat to the Sixty-eighth Congress. He was an unsuccessful candidate for reelection in 1924. He resumed the practice of law until 1935, when he was appointed judge of Northumberland County. He was subsequently elected and served until 1946. He resumed the practice of law and died in Sunbury, Pennsylvania. Interment in Pomfret Manor Cemetery in Sunbury.

Sources 
 
 The Political Graveyard

1873 births
1956 deaths
Judges of the Pennsylvania Courts of Common Pleas
Pennsylvania lawyers
Democratic Party members of the United States House of Representatives from Pennsylvania